Henry Arild Ruste (August 29, 1917 – October 31, 1993) was a Canadian politician from Alberta. He served in the Legislative Assembly of Alberta from 1955 to 1975 as a member of the Social Credit Party. Ruste served as a cabinet minister in the governments of Premier Ernest Manning and Harry Strom from 1965 to 1971.

Political career
Ruste was first elected in the 1955 Alberta general election in the electoral district of Wainwright. He defeated three other candidates by a comfortable margin to hold the seat for his party. In the 1959 general election he defeated three other candidates by a landslide., and in the 1963 election he improved his margin of victory from the last election.

Premier Ernest Manning appointed Ruste to the Executive Council of Alberta on February 16, 1965 as the Minister of Lands and Forests. Ruste ran for a fourth term in the 1967 general election and won a straight fight against NDP candidate Glenn Valleau with almost 85% of the popular vote.

On July 16, 1968 Premier Harry Strom moved Ruste to the Agriculture portfolio. On December 12, 1968 he was also appointed Minister of Lands and Mines and served as such until May 20, 1969.

Ruste ran in the 1971 general election and won by another landslide in his district even as the Social Credit government was defeated.  He served his final term in opposition and retired from the legislature at dissolution in 1975.

References

External links
Legislative Assembly of Alberta Members Listing

Alberta Social Credit Party MLAs
1917 births
1993 deaths
Members of the Executive Council of Alberta
Place of birth missing
Place of death missing